Cheech And Chong is the 1971 debut album of Cheech & Chong, produced by Lou Adler. It features "Dave", one of their most famous routines. The album peaked at #28 on the Billboard 200 the week of March 4, 1972. The album was nominated for Best Comedy Recording at the 14th Grammy Awards, but lost to Lily Tomlin's This Is a Recording.

At Christmas that year, a single was released with "Dave" on the B-side and with "Santa Claus and His Old Lady" (a sketch not available on any of the duo's LPs, but it does appear on a Dr Demento compilation) on the A-side. The single peaked at #38.

A possible bootleg of this LP has appeared on the Melody label (Melody SS-6020) with the same selections.   The cover is totally different from the copies on Ode and later reissued on Warner Brothers.  The Melody label was based in West Caldwell, New Jersey.

The album cover art is by Paul Gruwell.

Track listing 
All tracks by Cheech Marin and Tommy Chong, except where noted.

Production 
 Produced by Lou Adler
 Recorded & engineered by Norman Kinney

References 

1971 albums
Cheech & Chong albums
Ode Records albums
Warner Records albums
Warner Music Group albums
Albums produced by Lou Adler
1970s comedy albums